The Żegota Monument is a stone monument dedicated to the Żegota organization, which rescued Jews during the Holocaust in Poland.

Description
The monument has an inscription in three languages (Hebrew, Polish and English) summarizing the story of Żegota (the organization is also known as the Council to Aid Jews with the Government Delegation for Poland).  The inscription reads: "Relief Council For Jews 1942 Żegota 1945. The organization established by the Polish Underground State to rescue Jews of the Holocaust. It was the only such organization in German-occupied Europe which was sponsored and funded by its government-in-exile."

Unveiling
It was unveiled on 27 September 1995 by Władysław Bartoszewski, at that time the last surviving member of Żegota. During the opening ceremony, prayers were offered by Warsaw Chief Rabbi  and Bishop Stanislaw Gadecki. Other attendees included the ambassadors of Israel and the United States, and Polish-Jewish activist .

The monument was placed next to an oak tree, planted in 1988 to commemorate the 45th anniversary of the Warsaw Ghetto Uprising.

During commemorations and events related to the remembrance of the rescue of Jews during Holocaust in Poland, flowers are laid at the monument.

See also
Survivors' Park in Łódź, home to another monument dedicated to Żegota.

References

Monuments and memorials in Warsaw
1995 establishments in Poland
Holocaust memorials in Poland
1995 sculptures
Rescue of Jews by Poles in occupied Poland in 1939-1945